Marchmont H. "Marchy" Schwartz (March 20, 1909 – April 18, 1991) was an American college football player and coach. He played football at the University of Notre Dame from 1929 to 1931, and was a two-time All-American at halfback. Schwartz served as the head football coach at Creighton University from 1935 to 1939 and at Stanford University from 1942 to 1950, compiling a career college football coaching record of 47–50–6; Stanford, like may other universities, suspended football during World War II. He was inducted into the College Football Hall of Fame as a player in 1974.

Early life and playing career
Schwartz was of Jewish heritage, and was a graduate of Saint Stanislaus College high school in Bay St. Louis, Mississippi. From 1929 to 1930, he led Notre Dame, coached by Knute Rockne, to a 19–0 record and consecutive national championships. In a game against Carnegie Tech in 1931, he rushed for 188 yards, including touchdown runs of 58 and 60 yards.

Coaching career
Schwartz served as an assistant football coach at Notre Dame from 1932 to 1933 under Heartley Anderson, and at the University of Chicago in 1934 under Clark Shaughnessy. In 1940, Shaughnessy hired Schwartz as Stanford's backfield coach. He helped coach the 1940 "Wow Boys" that recorded a perfect season and won the 1941 Rose Bowl.

Death
Schwartz died on April 18, 1991 in Danville, California, aged 82.

Head coaching record

References

External links
 
 

1909 births
1991 deaths
American football halfbacks
Chicago Maroons football coaches
Creighton Bluejays athletic directors
Creighton Bluejays football coaches
Notre Dame Fighting Irish football coaches
Notre Dame Fighting Irish football players
Stanford Cardinal football coaches
All-American college football players
College Football Hall of Fame inductees
People from Danville, California
People from Bay St. Louis, Mississippi
Sportspeople from New Orleans
Players of American football from New Orleans
Players of American football from Mississippi
Jewish American sportspeople
20th-century American Jews